Jannis Rabold (born 27 March 2001) is a German footballer who plays as a right-back for Schweinfurt 05.

Career
Rabold made his professional debut for Karlsruher SC in the 2. Bundesliga on 17 December 2020, coming on as a substitute in the 89th minute for Marco Thiede against Erzgebirge Aue. The away match finished as a 1–4 loss for Karlsruhe.

References

External links
 
 
 
 

2001 births
Living people
Footballers from Karlsruhe
German footballers
Germany youth international footballers
Association football fullbacks
Karlsruher SC players
1. FC Schweinfurt 05 players
2. Bundesliga players